The Jigsaw Man is a 1983 British espionage film starring Michael Caine, Susan George,Laurence Olivier and Robert Powell. It was directed by Terence Young. The screenplay was written by Jo Eisinger, based on the novel The Jigsaw Man by Dorothea Bennett.

The film was inspired by the story of Kim Philby, a British intelligence officer who was secretly working for the KGB, then defected to the Soviet Union in 1963.

Plot
Sir Philip Kimberly, the former chief of Britain's Secret Intelligence Service who defected to Russia, is given plastic surgery and assigned back home by the KGB to retrieve vital intelligence documents. Once back in the United Kingdom, he escapes his Soviet handlers and sets out for business on his own, leading MI6 and the KGB on a hunt for him and the documents.

Cast
 Michael Caine – Philip Kimberley/Sergei Kuzminsky
 Laurence Olivier – Admiral Sir Gerald Scaith
 Susan George – Penelope Kimberley/Annabelle
 Robert Powell – Jamie Fraser
 Charles Gray – Sir James Chorley
 Vladek Sheybal – General Zorin
 Anthony Dawson – Vicar
 Michael Medwin – Milroy
 Sabine Sun – Doctor Zilenka

Plus uncredited cameos from:
 Max Bygraves
 William Walton
 Arthur Negus
 John Mills

Production
Director Terence Young cast Michael Caine to play the lead role. The second major role went to Laurence Olivier, thus reuniting the two actors who had previously received Academy Award nominations for their roles in the acclaimed Sleuth in 1972.

The Jigsaw Man had a troubled filming history. Filming began in 1982 but the film hit financial troubles, and was reportedly shut down due to cash difficulties. Laurence Olivier, who had been ill on and off since the late 1970s, collapsed on set. He also apparently walked away from the film after receiving no pay, with Caine following not long after. The actors returned when $4 million was secured as finance by Pakistani businessman, filmmaker and best seller author Mahmud Sipra.

Originally Mike Hodges was going to direct The Jigsaw Man, which, if he had cast Caine, would have been Hodges and Caine's third film after their cult classics Get Carter (1971) and Pulp (1972).

There are several uncredited cameos by friends of Olivier and Caine, who were invited to take part when they visited the set. These include Max Bygraves (3rd Policeman), William Walton (Salvation Army band leader), Arthur Negus (Man in trilby) and Sir John Mills as a Cockney bingo-caller.  Dame Eileen Atkins was supposed to have leapt out of a wedding cake, but the scene was subsequently cut as it was felt her cardboard and cellophane leotard was too obviously ill-fitting.

End Credits Song -
"Only You And I"  -
Music by Georges Garvarentz.
Lyrics by Labi Siffre, Scott English,
Sung by Dionne Warwick.
Produced by Bob Gaudio.
Rhythm arrangement by Jeremy Lubbock and Bob Gaudio.
String & horn arrangement by Jeremy Lubbock.
Recorded by Paul Lani and Rick Ruggieri.
Mixed by Ron Hitchcock.
Producers assistant: Marla Miller.
Recorded at Sound Lab Studios, Los Angeles, California.
Song & theme published by P.G.G. (Chappell Aznavour Ltd.)

Release
The film was given a 15 rating by the BBFC in August 1983 and was released by Thorn EMI.

The Jigsaw Man was released in DVD format in 2002 by Prism Leisure with the special features being limited to chapter selection options.

Reception
On Rotten Tomatoes, The Jigsaw Man holds a rating of 41% from 17 reviews.

References

External links

1983 films
British spy thriller films
Cold War spy films
1980s English-language films
Films based on British novels
British independent films
British political thriller films
Films directed by Terence Young
1980s spy thriller films
Films scored by John Cameron
Films set in London
Films shot in London
Films shot in Surrey
Films shot in Buckinghamshire
Films shot in Finland
Films shot in Berkshire
Films shot in Bedfordshire
Films shot in Hertfordshire
Films about the Secret Intelligence Service
Films about the KGB
1980s British films
1983 independent films